Provincial road N247 is a Dutch provincial road.

See also

References

External links

247
247